Bussell Branch is a stream in Oregon and Howell counties in the Ozarks of southern Missouri.

Bussell Branch has the name of Morton Bussell, a pioneer citizen.

See also
List of rivers of Missouri

References

Rivers of Howell County, Missouri
Rivers of Oregon County, Missouri
Rivers of Missouri